The 1962–63 Primeira Divisão was the 29th season of top-tier football in Portugal.

Overview
It was contested by 14 teams, and Benfica won the championship.

League standings

Results

References

External links
 Portugal 1962-63 - RSSSF (Jorge Miguel Teixeira)
 Portuguese League 1962/63 - footballzz.co.uk
 Portugal - Table of Honor - Soccer Library

Primeira Liga seasons
1962–63 in Portuguese football
Portugal